First is the debut solo album by David Gates, released in 1973.

Musicians who appear on the album include Larry Knechtel, Mike Botts, Jimmy Getzoff, Jim Gordon, Jim Horn, John Guerin, Larry Carlton, Louie Shelton, and Russ Kunkel.

Critical reception
The New Rolling Stone Record Guide wrote: "Above all, Gates displays a concern for lyrics and melody (indeed, for song structure) that is nothing if not admirable and praiseworthy. But he can also be totally insipid: side two of First is an emotional wasteland."

Track listing
All tracks composed and arranged by David Gates.
"Sail Around the World"
"Sunday Rider"
"Soap (I Use The)"
"Suite: Clouds, Rain"
"Help Is on the Way"
"Ann"
"Do You Believe He's Comin'"
"Sight and Sound"
"Lorilee"

Personnel
David Gates - guitar, vocals, composer, producer, arranger
James Getzoff - strings
Jim Gordon - drums
Jim Horn - saxophone
John Guerin - drums
Larry Carlton - guitar
Larry Knechtel - keyboards, associate producer
Louie Shelton - guitar
Mike Botts - drums
Russ Kunkel - drums
Technical
Armin Steiner, Bruce Morgan - engineer
Robert L. Heimall - cover design
Frank Bez - front cover photography

References

1973 debut albums
David Gates albums
Elektra Records albums